Live and at Large is the eleventh album by American singer-songwriter Jimmy Webb, released in June 2007 by the Jimmy Webb Music Company. This is Webb's first live album.

Critical reception
In his review for AllMusic, Mark Deming called the album "a fine audio snapshot of Jimmy Webb the performer" and noted that "it's no small compliment to say he's nearly as good at singing and playing his songs as he is at writing them". Deming continued:

The AllMusic website gave the album four out of five stars.

Track listing

Personnel
Music
 Jimmy Webb – vocals, piano

Production
 Fred Mollin – producer
 Joao Nazario – live recording
 "Teenage" Dave Salley – editing, mixing, and mastering at the Dog House, Nashville, Tennessee
 David Leaf – liner notes
 Robin Siegel – photos
 Mary Tiegreen – design

References

2007 live albums
Jimmy Webb albums